

Zwettl (Central Bavarian: Zwedl; Czech: Světlá) is a town and district capital of the Austrian state of Lower Austria. It is chiefly known as the location of Zwettl Abbey, first mentioned in October 1139.

History 
 
The name originates from Slavic "svetla" meaning "glade". Although the etymology suggests an early population of Slavic people no archeological evidence has been found yet. Zwettl was founded by the knights of Kuenring and was first mentioned in a monastery record in 1139. It was granted town privileges on December 28, 1200. Today, the Cistercian convent in Zwettl houses the only remaining manuscript of the life of the beguine mystic Agnes Blannbekin.

Geography 
Zwettl has a total area of 98.9 square miles (256.7 km²). The town is found in the middle of Waldviertel at the confluence of the Kamp and Zwettl rivers at the upper part of Kamptal. After Vienna and Wolfsberg in Carinthia, it is the third largest municipality in Austria by area.

Population

People 

 (Johann) Michael von Puchberg (1741–1822), promoter and estate administrators of Mozart, merchant, philanthropist, born here
 Georg Ritter von Schönerer, (1842-1921), died here
 Hugo Jury, (1887-1945), physician and National Socialist politician, lived here
 Benno Mengele (1898–1971), electrical engineer, born here
 Walter Nowotny, (1920-1944), Luftwaffe officer, lived here
 Peter Härtling, (born 1933), writer and poet, lived here
 Josef Haslinger (born 1955), writer, born here (de)
 Christoph Jank (born 1973), footballer
 Florian Metz, (born 1985), footballer, born here
 Andreas Haider-Maurer (born 1987), tennis player
 Andreas Onea (born 1992), Paralympic swimmer, born here

References

External links 

 Zwettl Town website 
 Facts about Zwettl provided by the Austrian Statistical Central Office 

 
Cities and towns in Zwettl District